The State of Mississippi has a total of twenty micropolitan areas that are fully or partially located in the state. 27 of the state's 82 counties are considered by the United States Census Bureau as micropolitan. As of the 2000 Census, these counties had a combined population of 1,001,735 (35.2% of the state's total population). Based on a July 1, 2008 population estimate, that figure had declined to 998,992 (33.8% of the state's total population).

Micropolitan areas

1 - part of the Columbus-Starkville-West Point combined statistical area
2 - part of the New Orleans–Metairie–Hammond combined statistical area
3 - part of the Jackson-Yazoo City combined statistical area

Population statistics

See also
List of metropolitan areas in Mississippi
List of cities in Mississippi
List of towns and villages in Mississippi
Mississippi census statistical areas
Table of United States primary census statistical areas (PCSA)
Table of United States Combined Statistical Areas (CSA)
Table of United States Metropolitan Statistical Areas (MSA)
Table of United States Micropolitan Statistical Areas (μSA)

References

 
Micropolitan areas